Alexander Kuchma (born 9 December 1980) is a former Kazakh football defender.

Career
In December 2014, Kuchma left FC Taraz.

Career statistics

International goals

References

External links

1980 births
Living people
Kazakhstani footballers
Association football defenders
Kazakhstan international footballers
FC Taraz players
FC Zhenis Astana players
FC Kairat players
Ruch Chorzów players
FC Tobol players
FC Ordabasy players
FC Okzhetpes players
FC Irtysh Pavlodar players
SG Sonnenhof Großaspach players
Kazakhstan Premier League players
Kazakhstani expatriate footballers
Expatriate footballers in Poland
Kazakhstani expatriate sportspeople in Poland
Kazakhstani people of Ukrainian descent
People from Taraz